Chalasani Aswani Dutt (also spelled Ashwini Dutt; born 15 September 1950) is an Indian film producer known for his work in the Telugu cinema. He established the film production company Vyjayanthi Movies in 1974 which is one of the biggest production houses in the Telugu film industry. In a career spanning nearly five decades, he has produced over 40 films with a majority of them in Telugu and a few in Hindi and Tamil languages. He is especially known for producing big-budget films with top movie stars and lavish production values on the Vyjayanthi Movies banner.

He also contested for the Vijayawada Lok Sabha constituency in the year 2004 General Elections as a Telugu Desam Party candidate.

Early and personal life 
Chalasani Aswani Dutt is born into a well-to-do family, in Vijayawada, Andhra Pradesh. His father was an A-class contractor in Andhra Pradesh and the sole distributor for Kalinga Pipes in the state, for many years. He completed his graduation. Jandhyala, who would later go on to become a noted film director and screenwriter, was Aswani Dutt's childhood friend. They were classmates from fourth standard till their graduation and also lived in neighbouring houses.

He has three daughters  Priyanka Dutt, Swapna Dutt and Sravanthi Dutt. Priyanka Dutt is married to film director Nag Ashwin who previously directed the film Yevade Subramanyam (2015) under Vyjayanthi Movies banner.

Film career 

Aswani Dutt started his film career as an executive producer for the black-and-white film O Seetha Katha (1974) directed by K. Viswanath. He wanted to produce a film with his favourite actor N. T. Rama Rao (NTR) and approached him. Named by NTR after the garland which is in Lord Krishna’s neck, Vyjayanthi Movies commenced production, under the proprietorship of Aswani Dutt. The logo of the production house contains the image of NTR as Lord Sri Krishna, with a Sankha in his hand and Earth behind him. The first film produced under Vyjayanthi Movies banner was Eduruleni Manishi (1975) starring NTR and Vanisri.

The production house went on to make films with the top movie stars of Telugu cinema like NTR, ANR, Krishna, Sobhan Babu, Krishnam Raju, Chiranjeevi, and Nagarjuna. Many of the films produced by Vyjayanthi Movies were directed by K. Bapayya and K. Raghavendra Rao.

Vyjayanthi Movies also has subsidiary banners  Three Angels Studio, Swapna Cinema run by Aswani Dutt's daughters Swapna Dutt and Priyanka Dutt. Of late, his daughters take care of the production part of the films produced by their production house, while the music is handled Aswani Dutt.

Vyjayanthi Movies had a successful run until it hit a rough patch with Sakthi in 2011. After this, Aswani Dutt took a seven-year hiatus. He produced Mahanati in 2018 which became one of the highest grossing films of the year.

Aswani Dutt mentions Jagadeka Veerudu Athiloka Sundari (1990) as his most favourite among all the films that he produced.

Shelved projects 
After the success of Jagadeka Veerudu Athiloka Sundari (1990), Aswani Dutt wanted to do fantasy film highlighting the CGI. So a film titled Bhooloka Veerudu was started in the direction of Singeetam Srinivasa Rao with Chiranjeevi in the lead role. After completing two schedules, they realized that they didn't have a proper story in hand and hence shelved the film.

Ram Gopal Varma narrated a story to Aswani Dutt which he liked. Varma was making Daud at that time and felt that the shooting of Daud might be stalled due to Sanjay Dutt's legal issues. So Varma narrated the story to Aswani Dutt and Chiranjeevi which they liked. Aswani Dutt started the project with Chiranjeevi as the lead in the direction of Ram Gopal Varma. After Sanjay Dutt's release, the shooting of Daud resumed. Then Aswani Dutt realized that the storylines for these two films are similar. As he was not comfortable in doing a film which had the same storyline to another film, he stalled the project.

Filmography 
Films produced under Vyjayanti Movies banner.

Swapna Cinema

Raghavendra Movie Corporation, Siri Media Arts, and United Producers (Aswani Dutt, Allu Aravind, and K. Raghavendra Rao)

Sri Priyanka Pictures

Roja Art Productions

References

Telugu film producers
Living people
Film producers from Andhra Pradesh
Telugu Desam Party politicians
Filmfare Awards South winners
Nandi Award winners
Hindi film producers
20th-century Indian businesspeople
21st-century Indian businesspeople
1950 births